Egnatia can refer to:

In Greece
 Egnatia, Ioannina, municipality in the Ioannina regional unit
 Egnatia, Thessaloniki, in the Thessaloniki regional unit
 Via Egnatia, an ancient Roman road in Illyria, Macedonia and Thrace
 Egnatia Odos, a modern highway in northern Greece

Elsewhere
 Egnatia, Byzacena, former city and bishopric in Roman Africa, now in Tunisia and a Latin titular see
 Egnatia, an ancient town in Apulia (Puglia, southern Italy) and former bishopric as Egnazia Appula; now Gnatia (part of Fasano), and a Latin titular see

Other 
 Egnatia gens, an ancient Roman family
 KS Egnatia, a football team based in Rrogozhinë, Albania